Hatest Grits: B-Sides And Bullshit is a compilation album by Californian punk rock band Swingin' Utters.
 It contains a collection of rare 7” singles, b-sides, album outtakes, compilation songs & covers, including 9 previously unreleased tracks.
 The insert includes liner notes on each song from band members past & present.

Track listing CD version
 "No Groove in Gunsights" (V/A - "I've Got My Friends" 1996)
 "To Return Now" (b-side "Teen Idol Eyes" 1999)
 "Where Are They Now" (V/A - "I've Got My Friends" 1996 - Cocksparrer cover)
 "Outside Life" (Fat Club #7 2001)
 "The Blue Lamp"
 "The Lonely" (V/A "That Darn Punk ost" 2000)
 "Back to You" (V/A "Short Music For Short People" 1999)
 "Teen Idol Eyes" (a-side 1999)
 "Heroes of the Corner Bar" (V/A "Plea For Peace Take Action" 2001)
 "I Got Your Number" (V/A "Punk Rock Jukebox" 1995 - Cocksparrer cover)
 "Annual Pimple"
 "Yesterday’s Dog End" (b-side "Nothing To Rely On 1995)
 "Nothing to Rely On" (a-side 1995)
 "Tomorrow Is Not New" (b-side "I Need Feedback" single 1998)
 "Black Mountain Rain" (Fat Club #7 2001)
 "Billy the Poop"
 "Mr. Keen"
 "Lady Luck"
 "I Follow" (V/A - "Fat Music 5: Live Fat, Die Young" 2001)
 "Sunday Stripper"
 "Sounds Wrong (demo)"
 "Jackie Jab (demo)"
 "Stupid Lullabies (demo)"
 "Time Tells Time (demo)"
 "Catastrophe (demo)"
 "We All Know"
 [Darius Kiski and His Accordion] (hidden track)
 "Beached Sailor (demo)" (hidden track)
 "(Take Me to the) Riverbank (demo)" (hidden track)
 "New Day Rising (demo)" (hidden track)
 "Fruitless Fortunes  (demo)" (hidden track)
 "My Glass House (demo)" (hidden track)

LP version
 The LP version only featured the first 20 songs of the list above. However the digital download card that accompanied the vinyl release offered the remaining six songs as a separate bonus download file.

A Side:
 "No Groove In Gunsights"
 "To Return Now"
 "Where Are They Now"
 "Outside Life"
 "The Blue Lamp"
 "The Lonely"
 "Back To You"
 "Teen Idol Eyes"
 "Heroes of the Corner Bar"
 "I Got Your Number"
 "Annual Pimple"

B Side:
 "Yesterday's Dog End"
 "Nothing to Rely On"
 "Tomorrow Is Not New"
 "Black Mountain Rain"
 "Billy the Poop"
 "Mr. Keen"
 "Lady Luck"
 "I Follow"
 "Sunday Stripper"

Personnel
 Johnny Bonnel (vocals)
 Darius Koski (guitar, vocals, accordion, piano, organ, violin, viola)
 Greg McEntee (drums)
 Spike Slawson (bass, vocals)
 Jack Dalrymple (guitar)

External links
Swingin' Utters official discography
Fat Wreck Chords

Swingin' Utters albums
2009 compilation albums
B-side compilation albums
Fat Wreck Chords compilation albums